Arseny Nikiforovich Semionov (January 23, 1911 – September 13, 1992) was a Soviet painter and art teacher, lived and worked in Leningrad, a member of the Leningrad Union of Artists, regarded as one of the representatives of the Leningrad school of painting, most famous for his landscape and cityscape paintings.

Biography 
Arseny Nikiforovich Semionov was born January 23, 1911, in the village of Maksimkovo, Polotsk Uyezd, Vitebsk Governorate, Russian Empire in the family of the master-builder of railway bridges. His father died when Arseny was four years old. The future artist spent his childhood in the Belarusian town of Bykhaw.

In 1927 Arseny Semionov arrives in Leningrad. He worked as a general worker, while engaged in painting and drawing at the private art studio of Alfred Eberling, a famous art teacher and a member of AKhRR (Association of Artists of Revolutionary Russia). In 1930, Arseny Semionov took preparatory courses at the Academy of Fine Arts and in the same year he became a student of the Institute of Proletarian Fine Art.

Arseny Semionov years of study coincided with a radically reformed of institute and the whole system of art education. In 1932, the period ended, notorious in the history of the institute as "maslovschina". October 11, 1932, the Central Executive Committee and the Council of People's Commissars accept the decree "On creation of the Academy of Arts." Institute of Proletarian Art was transformed into the Institute of Painting, Sculpture and Architecture. Thus was the line be drawn under 15-year period of continuous transformations of the largest art institutions in the Soviet Union. However, it took several years to ensure that assemble disparate teaching force and a new way to build an art education. A new director of the Academy of Fine Arts sculptor T. A. Matveev and his Deputy for Academic Affairs professor of painting Alexander Savinov his started this process. They invited for the teaching job at the institute professors Dmitry Kardovsky, Alexander Osmerkin, Semion Abugov, Eugene Lanceray, Nikolai Radlov, Pavel Shillingovsky, Isaak Brodsky and others, many have made subsequently to the formation of the Leningrad school of painting.

In 1934 the director of the All-Russian Academy of Arts and the Leningrad Institute of Painting, Sculpture and Architecture was appointed Isaak Brodsky, a student of Ilya Repin. According to Veronika Bogdan, it was just with the arrival of Brodsky to the leadership of the Academy that the active formation of the Leningrad school of painting began. To work at the Institute Brodsky attracts major artists and educators Konstantin Yuon, Pavel Naumov, Boris Ioganson, Alexander Lubimov, Rudolf Frentz, Nikolai Petrov, Vasily Shuhaev, Dmitry Kiplik, Nikolai Punin, Vasily Meshkov, Mikhail Bernshtein, Yefim Cheptsov, Ivan Bilibin, Matvey Manizer, Piotr Buchkin, Anna Ostroumova-Lebedeva, Alexei Karev, Leonid Ovsyannikov, Sergei Priselkov, Ivan Stepashkin, Konstantin Rudakov, and others. At the department of painting was re-established a system of individual creative workshops in which students continued their studies after the second course. Workshops led by professor Isaak Brodsky, Boris Ioganson, Vladimir Yakovlev, Dmitry Kardovsky, Alexander Osmerkin, Alexander Savinov, Rudolf Frentz, Pavel Shillingovsky. It was in the studio Dmitry Kardovsky Arseny Semionov was lucky to do in the years 1934–1937.

Methodology and views Kardovsky boiled down to the fact that, firstly, the Academy would give the student professional knowledge to the extent necessary for a mature implementation of the finished work of art – school, how loved to talk Kardovsky, common to all students regardless of their artistic inclinations and orientations. Talent does not ruin it, but its mediocre student enough to be useful worker in the life.

Second, studies should be carried out the influence of so-called "trends" in art. The task of the school – to give the student the knowledge and education, which is suitable for its development in any theoretical approach. Foundation of school – a study of the nature, utility – the study of art. The basis of learning – re-experience.

Third, the drawing should not be detached from the painting. A task, basically, need to be addressed comprehensively. Drawing – a means of mastering painting. Tone drawing – a means to organize color. The tone keep the unity of color. Therefore, the analysis of tone – the most important task for any art works. Finally, in the opinion of Kardovsky, the basis of all the work – identification of the disposition of nature.

Classes at the studio of Kardovsky, itself an outstanding personality of the teacher had a great influence on the fate of the young artist. His teaching methods and attitudes are deeply accepted by Arseny Semionov in his own teaching, which he has devoted almost half a century.

In 1937, shortly before graduation Institute in studio of Dmitry Kardovsky, Arseny Semenov became ill and was forced to stop training. After his recovery he obtained a certificate of completion of 5 courses of the department of painting without doing graduate work. He was sent to work in the Penza Art College. In 1938 Arseny Semionov accepted membership in the Penza Organization of Soviet Artists.

From 1939 to 1944 Arseny Semionov was in the Red Army's armored forces. He served in the Trans-Baikal and Mongolia. Party fights for Khalkhin Gol. From the first day of Great Patriotic War he participated in the battles. He rose from private to commander of a tank battalion. He was wounded five times, marked by military awards, including the Order of the Red Star, Order of the Patriotic War the first and second degrees, and medals. In 1944, Arseny Semionov was discharged on the injury.

From 1944 to 1947 Arseny Semionov taught at the High School of Arts at the Surikov Arts Institute in Moscow. In 1946 Semionov take in members of the Moscow organization of Soviet artists, he started to have participation in Moscow exhibitions. However, the paintings were created after a long break at work, there were only samples, an attempt to find its way into art.

In September 1947 Arseny Semionov returned to Leningrad and received a lecturer at the faculty of general painting of the Leningrad Higher School of Industrial Arts named after Vera Mukhina, where he worked for over forty years, nurtured several generations of artists. In the same 1947 he was accepted as a member of the Leningrad Union of Artists. Since the late 1940s Arseny Semionov participates in Exhibitions of Leningrad artists. Simultaneously he was working under graduate painting "Motherhood", and in 1951 after fifteen years of forced interruption ends Repin Institute of Arts.

Creativity 

Throughout his life, Arseny Semionov combined an active teaching career with creative activity. Its efficiency is striking. He painted cityscapes and landscapes, still lifes, genre scenes, portraits, and numerous etudes done from the life. He made creative trips to Staraya Ladoga, the Baltic States, Transcarpathia and Crimea. His personal Exhibitions were in Leningrad in 1966, 1977, and in Saint Petersburg in 2006.

In the works of late 1940s and early 1950s identified a number of themes and images, which tended artist. Leningrad motifs and ancient Russian cities would dominate in his works throughout life, although the methods of their scenic development will change in the direction of the artificial fixation of transience, the desire to convey the freshness and immediacy of color experience in the work of 1950–1960 years, to the search for more subtle and distributions of colors in the works of the late 1960s and 1970s, more decorative, based on the active use of local color and constructive drawing.

Crimea 

In the 1950s, which can conditionally be attributed to the early period of the artist, Semionov often spend summer time in the Crimea. The themes of his work  becomes Yalta and Gurzuf, picturesque corners of the old town and the rest on the seaside promenade. Semionov likes the southern sun and the sonorous brightness of colors. He eagerly seeks to convey on canvas his immediate impressions of the southern nature and life of the street, filled with the sun, contrasts of light and shadows and sporadic movement. The painting «In Yalta» (1957) is one of the best examples of the work of Semionov of the «Crimean» period. It illustrates the recognizable creative style of the artist of the late 1950s and early 1960s. Much of what was acquired in this early «Crimean» period of his work will be preserved in the individual manner of Semionov as its characteristic and recognizable features. The most interesting examples of the creativity of Semionov of this period can serve the works «Crimea Theme» (1955), «A Little Street in Yalta» (1958), «A Pier in the Yalta», «Embankment in Yalta», «Yalta Cargo Port», «Yalta Embankment», «Yalta. In the Park» (all 1959), and others.

Leningrad Theme 

In 1950–1960, the cityscape invariably occupied a prominent place in the work of Semionov. Some of them, such as «Spring Day» (1959), which depicts the perspective of one of the most beautiful streets of Leningrad, belongs to the best cityscapes created by Arseny Semionov in this genre at the turn of the 1950s and 1960s.

Among the works he created in this genre should be called «Spring City Landscape» and «Spring on the outskirts of Leningrad» (both 1956), «Narva Gate in Leningrad», «Marti Shipyards in Leningrad», «On the Neva River Embankment» (all 1957), «Boat Station at the Fontanka River» (1958), «Nevsky Prospekt», «Flower Market» (all 1959), «Fontanka River» and «Factory Motive» (both 1960), «St Isaac's Square in Leningrad», «Okhtinsky Bridge», «The University Embankment», «At the Kirov Prospekt» (all 1961), «The Neva River Embankment» (1962), «Spring on the Neva River» (1963), «Construction Zanevsky Bridge at the Neva River», «The Leningrad. View at the University Embankment», «The Leningrad Factory Theme», «Alexanrovsky Park in Leningrad» (all 1964), «Leningrad in Winter» (1965), and much others.

Old Russian Towns 

A special impact on the work of Semionov had a trips to the ancient Russian cities Pskov, Staritsa, Izborsk, Torzhok, Suzdal, Staraya Ladoga, Kostroma and work there. Having first discovered Pskov and Staraya Ladoga in the late 1950s, Semionov devoted many years to this topic. As an artist, he was attracted by living history, ancient architecture and a special way of life, organically combined with the surrounding nature. According to his works of this cycle, one can trace how his individual style has changed in 1960s in the direction of enhancing the decorativeness of painting and the sophistication of color. An example of these changes is the painting «Old Ladoga» (1964), in which the artist convincingly demonstrated a new understanding of color.

Among the works painted by him from the life during numerous trips to ancient Russian cities, it should be noted «Pskov Cathedral», «Pskov. Blue Gate», «A Little Bridge in Pskov» (all 1958), «Landscape with a River», «Pskov Ancient Town» (both 1960), «Old Ladoga. Winter Landscape», «Old Ladoga. The Village Council» (both 1961), «Fisherman moorage in New Ladoga», «New Ladoga in Holiday» (both 1962), «Fisherman's village», «Old Ladoga. View at the Volkhov River», «Pskov Cremlin» (all 1963),«Old Ladoga Town» (1964), «Old Ladoga» (1965), «St Sophia Cathedral in Novgorod the Great» (1966), «Suzdal. View of the Kremlin», «Suzdal. A Monuments of Architecture» (both 1968), «Torzhok city» (1969), «View of Suzdal», «View at the Cathedrals in Torzhok», «Street in Torzhok» (all 1971), and others.

In the 1960s Semionov repeatedly traveled to the Baltic and the Carpathians («Group of Houses in West Ukraine», 1966; «West Ukraine landscape with a Road», 1966; «West Ukraine Village», 1966), as well as visiting France and Italy. In his paintings appear more subtle and generalized colors. Disappears excessive fragmentation, it replaces the large wholeness and contemplation. Semionov often uses local color. In his painting is enhanced imagery and decorative. In some works of this period discern the influence of Sergei Osipov, a talented painter, with whom Arseny Semionov linked the long-standing friendship,  the creative journey, and common pedagogical work at the Department of Painting of the Vera Mukhina Institute.

Still-Life 

In the 1970s Arseny Semionov successfully appealed to a relatively rare for him genre of still life, creating a variety of decorative and fine works of art. Among them are marked at the art shows and in publications «Still Life with a Flower» (1972), «Still Life with antique sculpture» (1971), «Still Life with Flowers» (1975), «Still Life with Teapot» (1972), «Still Life with Jug and Apples» (1971), and others.

Self-Portrait 

Arseny Semenov rarely painted portraits. They were mostly images of family: his wife and daughter. Stand out self-portraits the artist painted them in the years of 1950–1960s. These works, in particular, «Self-Portrait» (1962) and «Self-Portrait» of 1964, open new facets of the artist's talents, making for a different look at the rest of his work. In a small laconic work Semionov used amazingly accurate means of expression, which allow him with the utmost frankness and depth to say about himself, about his generation and epoch.

In 1966 in Leningrad has been shown exhibition of works by Arseny Semionov, dedicated to the 55th anniversary of the artist and 20 years of his teaching work at the Department of Painting of the Vera Mukhina Institute. In 1977, in the halls of the Leningrad Union of Artists has been shown a joint exhibition of paintings by Arseny Semionov, Sergei Osipov, and Cyril Gushchin.

Arseny Nikiforovich Semionov died on 13, September, 1992, in St Petersburg at the eighty-second year of life. His paintings reside in Art museums and private collections in Russia, Japan, France, in the U.S., England, and throughout the world. In 2006 in Saint Petersburg in the Anna Akhmatova Museum hosted an exhibition of works by Arseny Semionov, timed to the publication of the monograph devoted to the life and art of artist.

Principal exhibitions 

 1954 (Leningrad): The Spring Exhibition of works by Leningrad artists of 1954, with Evgenia Antipova, Nikolai Baskakov, Sergei Frolov, Nikolai Galakhov, Vladimir Gorb, Maya Kopitseva, Boris Korneev, Elena Kostenko, Anna Kostrova, Gevork Kotiantz, Valeria Larina, Boris Lavrenko, Ivan Lavsky, Gavriil Malish, Alexei Mozhaev, Nikolai Mukho, Samuil Nevelshtein, Yuri Neprintsev, Sergei Osipov, Lev Russov, Ivan Savenko, Vladimir Seleznev, Arseny Semionov, Alexander Shmidt, Elena Skuin, Victor Teterin, Nikolai Timkov, Mikhail Tkachev, Leonid Tkachenko, Vecheslav Zagonek, and other important Leningrad artists.
 1955 (Leningrad): The Spring Exhibition of works by Leningrad artists of 1955, with Evgenia Antipova, Irina Baldina, Vladimir Gorb, Alexei Eriomin, Maya Kopitseva, Gevork Kotiantz, Boris Lavrenko, Ivan Lavsky, Dmitry Maevsky, Gavriil Malish, Nikolai Mukho, Lev Orekhov, Sergei Osipov, Lev Russov, Ivan Savenko, Arseny Semionov, Alexander Semionov, Yuri Shablikin, Alexander Shmidt, Elena Skuin, Nikolai Timkov, Leonid Tkachenko, Yuri Tulin, Piotr Vasiliev, Vecheslav Zagonek, Ruben Zakharian, and other important Leningrad artists.
 1956 (Leningrad): The Fall Exhibition of works by Leningrad artists of 1956, with Piotr Alberti, Taisia Afonina, Vsevolod Bazhenov, Irina Baldina, Nikolai Baskakov, Yuri Belov, Piotr Belousov, Piotr Buchkin, Sergei Frolov, Nikolai Galakhov, Vladimir Gorb, Abram Grushko, Alexei Eriomin, Mikhail Kaneev, Marina Kozlovskaya, Tatiana Kopnina, Maya Kopitseva, Boris Korneev, Alexander Koroviakov, Elena Kostenko, Nikolai Kostrov, Anna Kostrova, Gevork Kotiantz, Yaroslav Krestovsky, Ivan Lavsky, Oleg Lomakin, Dmitry Maevsky, Gavriil Malish, Alexei Mozhaev, Nikolai Mukho, Samuil Nevelshtein, Sergei Osipov, Vladimir Ovchinnikov, Lev Russov, Ivan Savenko, Gleb Savinov, Vladimir Seleznev, Alexander Semionov, Arseny Semionov, Yuri Shablikin, Boris Shamanov, Alexander Shmidt, Nadezhda Shteinmiller, Victor Teterin, Nikolai Timkov, Mikhail Tkachev, Mikhail Trufanov, Yuri Tulin, Piotr Vasiliev, Igor Veselkin, Rostislav Vovkushevsky, Vecheslav Zagonek, Ruben Zakharian, Sergei Zakharov, and other important Leningrad artists.
 1957 (Leningrad): 1917–1957. Leningrad Artist's works of Art Exhibition, with Evgenia Antipova, Vsevolod Bazhenov, Irina Baldina, Nikolai Baskakov, Piotr Belousov, Piotr Buchkin, Zlata Bizova, Vladimir Chekalov, Sergei Frolov, Nikolai Galakhov, Abram Grushko, Alexei Eriomin, Mikhail Kaneev, Engels Kozlov, Tatiana Kopnina, Maya Kopitseva, Boris Korneev, Alexander Koroviakov, Nikolai Kostrov, Anna Kostrova, Gevork Kotiantz, Yaroslav Krestovsky, Boris Lavrenko, Ivan Lavsky, Oleg Lomakin, Dmitry Maevsky, Gavriil Malish, Alexei Mozhaev, Evsey Moiseenko, Nikolai Mukho, Mikhail Natarevich, Samuil Nevelshtein, Dmitry Oboznenko, Lev Orekhov, Sergei Osipov, Vladimir Ovchinnikov, Nikolai Pozdneev, Alexander Pushnin, Lev Russov, Galina Rumiantseva, Ivan Savenko, Gleb Savinov, Alexander Samokhvalov, Arseny Semionov, Alexander Semionov, Boris Shamanov, Alexander Shmidt, Nadezhda Shteinmiller, Galina Smirnova, Ivan Sorokin, Victor Teterin, Mikhail Tkachev, Leonid Tkachenko, Yuri Tulin, Ivan Varichev, Nina Veselova, Rostislav Vovkushevsky, Anatoli Vasiliev, Lazar Yazgur, Vecheslav Zagonek, Ruben Zakharian, Sergei Zakharov, Maria Zubreeva, and other important Leningrad artists.
 1958 (Leningrad): The Fall Exhibition of works by Leningrad artists of 1958, with Taisia Afonina, Irina Baldina, Evgenia Baykova, Vsevolod Bazhenov, Piotr Belousov, Yuri Belov, Zlata Bizova, Sergei Frolov, Nikolai Galakhov, Elena Gorokhova, Abram Grushko, Alexei Eriomin, Mikhail Kaneev, Marina Kozlovskaya, Tatiana Kopnina, Boris Korneev, Alexander Koroviakov, Elena Kostenko, Nikolai Kostrov, Anna Kostrova, Gevork Kotiantz, Yaroslav Krestovsky, Valeria Larina, Boris Lavrenko, Ivan Lavsky, Piotr Litvinsky, Oleg Lomakin, Dmitry Maevsky, Gavriil Malish, Alexei Mozhaev, Evsey Moiseenko, Nikolai Mukho, Anatoli Nenartovich, Yuri Neprintsev, Dmitry Oboznenko, Sergei Osipov, Vladimir Ovchinnikov, Nikolai Pozdneev, Alexander Pushnin, Maria Rudnitskaya, Galina Rumiantseva, Lev Russov, Ivan Savenko, Gleb Savinov, Alexander Samokhvalov, Arseny Semionov, Alexander Semionov, Yuri Shablikin, Boris Shamanov, Alexander Shmidt, Nadezhda Shteinmiller, Elena Skuin, Alexander Sokolov, Nikolai Timkov, Yuri Tulin, Ivan Varichev, Anatoli Vasiliev, Piotr Vasiliev, Igor Veselkin, Vecheslav Zagonek, and other important Leningrad artists.
 1960 (Leningrad): Exhibition of works by Leningrad artists of 1960, with Piotr Alberti, Evgenia Antipova, Taisia Afonina, Genrikh Bagrov, Vsevolod Bazhenov, Nikolai Baskakov, Zlata Bizova, Nikolai Galakhov, Vladimir Gorb, Abram Grushko, Alexei Eriomin, Mikhail Kaneev, Mikhail Kozell, Marina Kozlovskaya, Boris Korneev, Alexander Koroviakov, Elena Kostenko, Nikolai Kostrov, Anna Kostrova, Gevork Kotiantz, Yaroslav Krestovsky, Boris Lavrenko, Ivan Lavsky, Oleg Lomakin, Dmitry Maevsky, Alexei Mozhaev, Evsey Moiseenko, Nikolai Mukho, Andrey Milnikov, Piotr Nazarov, Vera Nazina, Mikhail Natarevich, Samuil Nevelshtein, Dmitry Oboznenko, Sergei Osipov, Nikolai Pozdneev, Maria Rudnitskaya, Vladimir Sakson, Alexander Samokhvalov, Alexander Semionov, Arseny Semionov, Yuri Shablikin, Boris Shamanov, Alexander Shmidt, Elena Skuin, Alexander Sokolov, Alexander Stolbov, Victor Teterin, Nikolai Timkov, Yuri Tulin, Ivan Varichev, Rostislav Vovkushevsky, Vecheslav Zagonek, Ruben Zakharian, and other important Leningrad artists.
 1960 (Leningrad): Exhibition of works by Leningrad artists of 1960, with Piotr Alberti, Evgenia Antipova, Taisia Afonina, Genrikh Bagrov, Vsevolod Bazhenov, Irina Baldina, Nikolai Baskakov, Yuri Belov, Piotr Belousov, Piotr Buchkin, Zlata Bizova, Vladimir Chekalov, Sergei Frolov, Nikolai Galakhov, Vladimir Gorb, Elena Gorokhova, Abram Grushko, Alexei Eriomin, Mikhail Kaneev, Engels Kozlov, Marina Kozlovskaya, Tatiana Kopnina, Maya Kopitseva, Boris Korneev, Alexander Koroviakov, Elena Kostenko, Nikolai Kostrov, Anna Kostrova, Gevork Kotiantz, Vladimir Krantz, Yaroslav Krestovsky, Valeria Larina, Boris Lavrenko, Ivan Lavsky, Piotr Litvinsky, Oleg Lomakin, Dmitry Maevsky, Gavriil Malish, Nikita Medovikov, Evsey Moiseenko, Nikolai Mukho, Andrey Milnikov, Vera Nazina, Mikhail Natarevich, Anatoli Nenartovich, Samuil Nevelshtein, Dmitry Oboznenko, Vladimir Ovchinnikov, Vecheslav Ovchinnikov, Sergei Osipov, Nikolai Pozdneev, Alexander Pushnin, Lev Russov, Galina Rumiantseva, Maria Rudnitskaya, Ivan Savenko, Vladimir Sakson, Gleb Savinov, Alexander Samokhvalov, Alexander Semionov, Arseny Semionov, Yuri Shablikin, Boris Shamanov, Alexander Shmidt, Nadezhda Shteinmiller, Elena Skuin, Galina Smirnova, Alexander Sokolov, Alexander Stolbov, Victor Teterin, Nikolai Timkov, Mikhail Tkachev, Leonid Tkachenko, Mikhail Trufanov, Yuri Tulin, Ivan Varichev, Anatoli Vasiliev, Valery Vatenin, Nina Veselova, Rostislav Vovkushevsky, Vecheslav Zagonek, Sergei Zakharov, Ruben Zakharian, and other important Leningrad artists.
 1961 (Leningrad): Exhibition of works by Leningrad artists of 1961, with Piotr Alberti, Evgenia Antipova, Taisia Afonina, Vsevolod Bazhenov, Irina Baldina, Nikolai Baskakov, Yuri Belov, Piotr Belousov, Piotr Buchkin, Zlata Bizova, Nikolai Galakhov, Elena Gorokhova, Abram Grushko, Alexei Eriomin, Mikhail Kaneev, Mikhail Kozell, Engels Kozlov, Marina Kozlovskaya, Maya Kopitseva, Boris Korneev, Elena Kostenko, Anna Kostrova, Gevork Kotiantz, Yaroslav Krestovsky, Valeria Larina, Boris Lavrenko, Ivan Lavsky, Oleg Lomakin, Dmitry Maevsky, Gavriil Malish, Nikita Medovikov, Evsey Moiseenko, Alexei Mozhaev, Nikolai Mukho, Vera Nazina, Mikhail Natarevich, Anatoli Nenartovich, Samuil Nevelshtein, Yuri Neprintsev, Dmitry Oboznenko, Sergei Osipov, Vladimir Ovchinnikov, Nikolai Pozdneev, Alexander Pushnin, Galina Rumiantseva, Lev Russov, Maria Rudnitskaya, Ivan Savenko, Gleb Savinov, Vladimir Sakson, Alexander Samokhvalov, Vladimir Seleznev, Arseny Semionov, Alexander Semionov, Yuri Shablikin, Boris Shamanov, Alexander Shmidt, Nadezhda Shteinmiller, Elena Skuin, Galina Smirnova, Alexander Sokolov, Alexander Stolbov, Victor Teterin, Nikolai Timkov, Leonid Tkachenko, Mikhail Trufanov, Yuri Tulin, Ivan Varichev, Anatoli Vasiliev, Piotr Vasiliev, Valery Vatenin, Lazar Yazgur, Vecheslav Zagonek, Sergei Zakharov, Maria Zubreeva, and other important Leningrad artists.
 1962 (Leningrad): The Fall Exhibition of works by Leningrad artists of 1962, with Piotr Alberti, Evgenia Antipova, Taisia Afonina, Vsevolod Bazhenov, Nikolai Galakhov, Yuri Belov, Vladimir Gorb, Abram Grushko, Alexei Eremin, Engels Kozlov, Alexander Koroviakov, Boris Lavrenko, Ivan Lavsky, Valeria Larina, Oleg Lomakin, Gavriil Malish, Evsey Moiseenko, Nikolai Mukho, Piotr Nazarov, Vera Nazina, Mikhail Natarevich, Dmitry Oboznenko, Lev Orekhov, Vladimir Ovchinnikov, Sergei Osipov, Nikolai Pozdneev, Galina Rumiantseva, Gleb Savinov, Alexander Semionov, Arseny Semionov, Nadezhda Shteinmiller, Alexander Sokolov, Alexander Stolbov, Alexander Tatarenko, Victor Teterin, Nikolai Timkov, Mikhail Trufanov, Yuri Tulin, Ivan Varichev, Anatoli Vasiliev, Valery Vatenin, Rostislav Vovkushevsky, Vecheslav Zagonek, and other important Leningrad artists.
 1964 (Leningrad): The Leningrad Fine Arts Exhibition, with Piotr Alberti, Evgenia Antipova, Taisia Afonina, Irina Baldina, Nikolai Baskakov, Evgenia Baykova, Vsevolod Bazhenov, Yuri Belov, Piotr Belousov, Piotr Buchkin, Zlata Bizova, Vladimir Chekalov, Sergei Frolov, Nikolai Galakhov, Vasily Golubev, Tatiana Gorb, Abram Grushko, Alexei Eriomin, Mikhail Kaneev, Yuri Khukhrov, Mikhail Kozell, Marina Kozlovskaya, Tatiana Kopnina, Maya Kopitseva, Boris Korneev, Alexander Koroviakov, Elena Kostenko, Nikolai Kostrov, Anna Kostrova, Gevork Kotiantz, Yaroslav Krestovsky, Valeria Larina, Boris Lavrenko, Ivan Lavsky, Piotr Litvinsky, Oleg Lomakin, Dmitry Maevsky, Gavriil Malish, Evsey Moiseenko, Nikolai Mukho, Piotr Nazarov, Vera Nazina, Mikhail Natarevich, Anatoli Nenartovich, Yuri Neprintsev, Dmitry Oboznenko, Sergei Osipov, Vladimir Ovchinnikov, Nikolai Pozdneev, Alexander Pushnin, Galina Rumiantseva, Ivan Savenko, Gleb Savinov, Vladimir Sakson, Alexander Samokhvalov, Vladimir Seleznev, Arseny Semionov, Alexander Semionov, Yuri Shablikin, Boris Shamanov, Alexander Shmidt, Nadezhda Shteinmiller, Elena Skuin, Galina Smirnova, Alexander Sokolov, Ivan Sorokin, Victor Teterin, Nikolai Timkov, Mikhail Tkachev, Mikhail Trufanov, Yuri Tulin, Vitaly Tulenev, Ivan Varichev, Anatoli Vasiliev, Piotr Vasiliev, Valery Vatenin, Lazar Yazgur, Vecheslav Zagonek, Sergei Zakharov, Ruben Zakharian, and other important Leningrad artists.
 1965 (Leningrad): The Spring Exhibition of works by Leningrad artists of 1965, with Piotr Alberti, Evgenia Antipova, Taisia Afonina, Vsevolod Bazhenov, Yuri Belov, Vladimir Gavrilov, Irina Getmanskaya, Vasily Golubev, Irina Dobrekova, Maya Kopitseva, Alexander Koroviakov, Mikhail Kozell, Engels Kozlov, Elena Kostenko, Gevork Kotiantz, Vladimir Krantz, Valeria Larina, Boris Lavrenko, Ivan Lavsky, Oleg Lomakin, Dmitry Maevsky, Gavriil Malish, Valentina Monakhova, Nikolai Mukho, Vera Nazina, Mikhail Natarevich, Anatoli Nenartovich, Dmitry Oboznenko, Sergei Osipov, Lev Orekhov, Victor Otiev, Nikolai Pozdneev, Maria Rudnitskaya, Ivan Savenko, Vladimir Sakson, Alexander Semionov, Arseny Semionov, Boris Shamanov, Alexander Shmidt, Nadezhda Shteinmiller, Elena Skuin, Alexander Stolbov, Victor Teterin, Nikolai Timkov, Yuri Tulin, Vitaly Tulenev, Ivan Varichev, Anatoli Vasiliev, Igor Veselkin, Rostislav Vovkushevsky, Lazar Yazgur, Vecheslav Zagonek, Ruben Zakharian, and other important Leningrad artists.
 1968 (Leningrad): The Fall Exhibition of works by Leningrad artists of 1968, with Piotr Alberti, Vsevolod Bazhenov, Sergei Frolov, Nikolai Galakhov, Tatiana Gorb, Vladimir Gorb, Mikhail Kaneev, Mikhail Kozell, Engels Kozlov, Elena Kostenko, Nikolai Kostrov, Anna Kostrova, Gevork Kotiantz, Vladimir Krantz, Ivan Lavsky, Dmitry Maevsky, Gavriil Malish, Nikolai Mukho, Mikhail Natarevich, Sergei Osipov, Vladimir Ovchinnikov, Lev Orekhov, Victor Otiev, Maria Rudnitskaya, Ivan Savenko, Vladimir Sakson, Alexander Semionov, Arseny Semionov, Boris Shamanov, Alexander Shmidt, Elena Skuin, Alexander Stolbov, German Tatarinov, Mikhail Trufanov, Yuri Tulin, Ivan Varichev, Anatoli Vasiliev, Rostislav Vovkushevsky, Lazar Yazgur, Vecheslav Zagonek, Sergei Zakharov, Ruben Zakharian, and other important Leningrad artists.
 1972 (Leningrad): Our Contemporary The Second Exhibition of works by Leningrad artists of 1972, with Irina Baldina, Nikolai Baskakov, Piotr Belousov, Nikolai Galakhov,  Irina Getmanskaya, Tatiana Gorb, Irina Dobrekova, Alexei Eriomin, Engels Kozlov, Maya Kopitseva, Boris Korneev, Elena Kostenko, Nikolai Kostrov, Anna Kostrova, Gevork Kotiantz, Boris Lavrenko, Oleg Lomakin, Dmitry Maevsky, Vera Nazina, Samuil Nevelshtein, Dmitry Oboznenko, Sergei Osipov, Kapitolina Rumiantseva, Ivan Savenko, Vladimir Sakson, Arseny Semionov, Alexander Shmidt, Nikolai Timkov, Anatoli Vasiliev, Vecheslav Zagonek, and other important Leningrad artists.
 1972 (Leningrad): Across the Motherland Exhibition of Leningrad artists dedicated to 50th Anniversary of USSR, with Evgenia Antipova, Nikolai Baskakov, Olga Bogaevskaya, Sergei Frolov, Nikolai Galakhov, Vasily Golubev, Tatiana Gorb, Vladimir Gorb, Irina Dobrekova, Mikhail Kaneev, Mikhail Kozell, Marina Kozlovskaya, Engels Kozlov, Maya Kopitseva, Boris Korneev, Elena Kostenko, Nikolai Kostrov, Anna Kostrova, Gevork Kotiantz, Yaroslav Krestovsky, Ivan Lavsky, Oleg Lomakin, Dmitry Maevsky, Gavriil Malish, Evsey Moiseenko, Piotr Nazarov, Samuil Nevelshtein, Dmitry Oboznenko, Sergei Osipov, Nikolai Pozdneev, Ivan Savenko, Gleb Savinov, Vladimir Sakson, Arseny Semionov, Alexander Sokolov,  German Tatarinov, Victor Teterin, Nikolai Timkov, Mikhail Trufanov, Yuri Tulin, Vitaly Tulenev, Ivan Varichev, Igor Veselkin, Valery Vatenin, Vecheslav Zagonek, and other important Leningrad artists.
 1975 (Leningrad): Our Contemporary regional exhibition of Leningrad artists of 1975, with Evgenia Antipova, Taisia Afonina, Vsevolod Bazhenov, Irina Baldina, Nikolai Baskakov, Piotr Belousov, Veniamin Borisov, Zlata Bizova, Nikolai Galakhov, Vasily Golubev, Elena Gorokhova, Abram Grushko,  Irina Dobrekova, Alexei Eriomin, Mikhail Kaneev, Yuri Khukhrov, Mikhail Kozell, Marina Kozlovskaya, Engels Kozlov, Maya Kopitseva, Boris Korneev, Elena Kostenko, Nikolai Kostrov, Anna Kostrova, Gevork Kotiantz, Vladimir Krantz, Yaroslav Krestovsky, Boris Lavrenko, Oleg Lomakin, Dmitry Maevsky, Gavriil Malish, Evsey Moiseenko, Piotr Nazarov, Vera Nazina, Mikhail Natarevich, Yuri Neprintsev, Samuil Nevelshtein, Dmitry Oboznenko, Sergei Osipov, Vladimir Ovchinnikov, Nikolai Pozdneev, Alexander Pushnin, Galina Rumiantseva, Kapitolina Rumiantseva, Ivan Savenko, Gleb Savinov, Vladimir Sakson, Alexander Samokhvalov, Arseny Semionov, Alexander Semionov, Yuri Shablikin, Boris Shamanov, Alexander Shmidt, Nadezhda Shteinmiller, Elena Skuin, Galina Smirnova, Alexander Stolbov, Victor Teterin, Nikolai Timkov, Leonid Tkachenko, Mikhail Trufanov, Yuri Tulin, Vitaly Tulenev, Ivan Varichev, Anatoli Vasiliev, Igor Veselkin, Valery Vatenin, Lazar Yazgur, Vecheslav Zagonek, and other important Leningrad artists.
 1976 (Moscow): The Fine Arts of Leningrad, with Mikhail Avilov, Evgenia Antipova, Nathan Altman, Irina Baldina, Nikolai Baskakov, Yuri Belov, Piotr Belousov, Isaak Brodsky, Piotr Buchkin, Rudolf Frentz, Nikolai Galakhov, Vasily Golubev, Abram Grushko, Alexei Eriomin, Mikhail Kaneev, Engels Kozlov, Marina Kozlovskaya, Maya Kopitseva, Boris Korneev, Elena Kostenko, Nikolai Kostrov, Anna Kostrova, Gevork Kotiantz, Boris Lavrenko, Oleg Lomakin, Alexander Lubimov, Dmitry Maevsky, Gavriil Malish, Evsey Moiseenko, Mikhail Natarevich, Vera Nazina, Yuri Neprintsev, Samuil Nevelshtein, Dmitry Oboznenko, Sergei Osipov, Vladimir Ovchinnikov, Nikolai Pozdneev, Alexander Pushnin, Victor Oreshnikov, Ivan Savenko, Vladimir Sakson, Gleb Savinov, Alexander Samokhvalov, Vladimir Seleznev, Alexander Semionov, Arseny Semionov, Boris Shamanov, Nadezhda Shteinmiller, Elena Skuin, Galina Smirnova, Alexander Sokolov,  Victor Teterin, Nikolai Timkov, Mikhail Trufanov, Yuri Tulin, Ivan Varichev, Anatoli Vasiliev,  Valery Vatenin, Nina Veselova, Vecheslav Zagonek, Sergei Zakharov, and other important Leningrad artists.
 1977 (Leningrad): Exhibition of works by Arseny Semionov, Sergei Osipov, and Kirill A. Guschin.
 1994 (Pont-Audemer): Dessins, Gravures, Sculptures et Tableaux du XX siecle du fonds de L' Union des Artistes de Saint-Petersbourg, with Abram Grushko, Vasily Golubev, Elena Kostenko, Maya Kopitseva, Gevork Kotiantz, Marina Kozlovskaya, Valeria Larina, Boris Lavrenko, Valentina Monakhova, Mikhail Natarevich, Ivan Savenko, Vladimir Sakson, Arseny Semionov, Alexander Shmidt, Elena Skuin, Nikolai Timkov, Yuri Tulin, Vitaly Tulenev, Ivan Varichev, Igor Veselkin, and other important Leningrad artists.
 2006 (Saint Petersburg): Exhibition of works by Arseny Semionov in Anna Akhmatova Memorial Museum.

Bibliography 
 Spring Exhibition of works by Leningrad artists of 1954. Catalogue.. Leningrad, Izogiz Edition, 1954. P.18.
 Spring Exhibition of works by Leningrad artists of 1955. Catalogue. Leningrad, Leningrad Union of Artists, 1956. P.17.
 The Fall Exhibition of works by Leningrad artists of 1956. Catalogue. Leningrad, Leningrad artist, 1958. P.22.
 1917–1957. Exhibition of works by Leningrad artists. Catalogue. Leningrad, Khudozhnik RSFSR, 1958. P.29.
 The Fall Exhibition of works by Leningrad artists of 1958. Catalogue. Leningrad, Khudozhnik RSFSR, 1959. P.24.
 Exhibition of works by Leningrad artists of 1960. Exhibition catalogue. Leningrad, Khudozhnik RSFSR, 1963. P.16.
 Exhibition of works by Leningrad artists of 1960. Exhibition catalogue. Leningrad, Khudozhnik RSFSR, 1961. P.37.
 Exhibition of works by Leningrad artists of 1961. Exhibition catalogue. Leningrad, Khudozhnik RSFSR, 1964. P.36–37.
 The Fall Exhibition of works by Leningrad artists of 1962. Catalogue. Leningrad, Khudozhnik RSFSR, 1962. P.24.
 The Leningrad Fine Arts Exhibition. Leningrad, Khudozhnik RSFSR, 1965. P.48-49.
 The Spring Exhibition of works by Leningrad artists of 1965. Catalogue. Leningrad, Khudozhnik RSFSR, 1970. P.27.
 The Fall Exhibition of works by Leningrad artists of 1968. Catalogue. Leningrad, Khudozhnik RSFSR, 1971. P.14.
 Exhibition of works by Leningrad artists dedicated to the 25th Anniversary of the Victory in Great Patriotic war. Catalogue. Leningrad, Khudozhnik RSFSR, 1972. P.10.
 Our Contemporary The Second Exhibition of works by Leningrad artists of 1972. Catalogue. Leningrad, Khudozhnik RSFSR, 1973. P.11.
 The Still-Life Exhibition of works by Leningrad artists. Exhibition catalogue. Leningrad, Khudozhnik RSFSR, 1973. P.12.
 Across the Motherland Exhibition of Leningrad artists. Catalogue. Leningrad, Khudozhnik RSFSR, 1974. P.23.
 "Our Contemporary" regional exhibition of Leningrad artists of 1975. Catalogue. Leningrad, Khudozhnik RSFSR, 1980. P.24.
 The Fine Arts of Leningrad. Exhibition catalogue. Leningrad, Khudozhnik RSFSR, 1976. P.30.
 The Portrait of Contemporary the Fifth Exhibition of works by Leningrad artists of 1976. Catalogue. Leningrad, Khudozhnik RSFSR, 1983. P.19.
 Arseny N. Semionov, Sergei I. Osipov, Kirill A. Guschin. Exhibition catalogue. Leningrad, Khudozhnik RSFSR, 1977.
 Exhibition of works by Leningrad artists dedicated to the 60th Anniversary of October Revolution. Catalogue. Leningrad, Khudozhnik RSFSR, 1982. P.21.
 Directory of members of the Union of Artists of USSR. Vol.2. Moscow, Soviet artist, 1979. P.330.
 Regional Exhibition of works by Leningrad artists of 1980. Exhibition catalogue. Leningrad, Khudozhnik RSFSR, 1983. P.22.
 Exhibition of works by Leningrad artists dedicated to the 40th Anniversary of the complete liberation of Leningrad from the enemy blockade. Leningrad, Khudozhnik RSFSR, 1984. P.12.
 Exhibition of works by Leningrad artists-veterans of Great Patriotic war. Leningrad, Khudozhnik RSFSR, 1990. P.13.
 Directory of members of the Leningrad branch of Union of Artists of Russian Federation. Leningrad, Khudozhnik RSFSR, 1987. P.117.
 Saint-Pétersbourg – Pont-Audemer.  Dessins, Gravures, Sculptures et Tableaux du XX siècle du fonds de L' Union des Artistes de Saint-Pétersbourg. Pont-Audemer, 1994. P.53, 68–69, 95, 117.
 Matthew C. Bown. Dictionary of 20th Century Russian and Soviet Painters 1900-1980s. London, Izomar, 1998. , .
 Arseny Semionov. Painting. Drawing. Saint Petersburg, NP-Print, 2006.
 Sergei V. Ivanov. Unknown Socialist Realism. The Leningrad School. Saint Petersburg, NP-Print Edition, 2007. , .
 The Leningrad School of Painting. Essays on the History. St Petersburg, ARKA Gallery Publishing, 2019. .

See also 
 Fine Art of Leningrad
 Leningrad School of Painting
 List of Russian artists
 List of 20th-century Russian painters
 List of painters of Saint Petersburg Union of Artists
 List of the Russian Landscape painters
 Saint Petersburg Union of Artists

References

External links 

 Exhibition of Arseny Semionov in ARKA Fine Art Gallery
 Arseny Semionov. Painting of 1950-1970s. (VIDEO)
 The City of Leningrad in paintings of Arseny Semionov (VIDEO)

1911 births
1992 deaths
People from Vitebsk Governorate
Soviet painters
Socialist realist artists
Leningrad School artists
Members of the Leningrad Union of Artists
Soviet military personnel of World War II
Repin Institute of Arts alumni